The Kelvin Aqueduct is a navigable aqueduct in Glasgow, Scotland, which carries the Forth and Clyde Canal over the River Kelvin.

History

It was designed by Robert Whitworth, one of John Smeaton's supervising engineers on the Forth and Clyde Canal project. The contractors were William Gibb (founder of the engineering dynasty that led to Sir Alexander Gibb & Partners) and John Muir, who also built the nearby Maryhill locks. A foundation stone was laid on 16 June 1787 by Archibald Spiers, the chairman of the canal committee.

When opened in 1790 it was Britain's largest aqueduct, and onlookers were impressed at the sight of sailing boats crossing above them. The entire project cost £8,509, exceeding the original estimated cost of £6,200.

It was protected as a category A listed building in 1989.

Design

The piers are buttressed in such a way as to resemble cutwaters, but only one pier sits in the river. The sides of the aqueduct are arched in order to transfer the outward pressure of the water onto the buttresses, an effect which can clearly be seen from above. This design feature is also present on the Luggie Aqueduct at Kirkintilloch, which opened in 1773.

The aqueduct is built from rustic masonry at the lower levels and polished ashlar above. Underneath it is the Kelvin Walkway, which runs through an area of green space around the river.

See also

List of canal aqueducts in Great Britain

References

Bridges in Glasgow
Transport in Glasgow
Navigable aqueducts in Scotland
Category A listed buildings in Glasgow
Listed bridges in Scotland
Listed canals in Scotland
Maryhill